The 1957–58 season was the 50th year of football played by Dundee United, and covers the period from 1 July 1957 to 30 June 1958. United finished in ninth place in the Second Division.

Match results
Dundee United played a total of 44 competitive matches during the 1957–58 season.

Legend

All results are written with Dundee United's score first.
Own goals in italics

Second Division

Scottish Cup

League Cup

See also
 1957–58 in Scottish football

References

Dundee United F.C. seasons
Dundee United